was a  after Shōka and before Kōchō. This period spanned the years from April 1260 to February 1261.

Change of era
 1260 : The new era name was created to mark an event or a number of events. The years of the Shōgen era was in a period marked by famine and epidemics; and the era name was changed in quick succession in the hope that this might bring them to a close.  The previous era ended and a new one commenced in Shōka 3.

Events of the Bun'ō era
 1260 (Bun'ō 1): Crop failures brought widespread starvation. 
 1260 (Bun'ō 1): Nichiren preached in the streets of Kamakura.<ref>Lloyd, Arthur. (1912). {{Google books|t9BAAAAAYAAJ|'The Creed of Half Japan: Historical Sketches of Japanese Buddhism, p. 287|page=287}}</ref> 
 July 16, 1260 (Bun'ō 1, 7th day of the 6th month): Nichiren submitted a formal remonstrance to Hojo Tokiyori; this was the "Treatise on Securing Peace in the Land through the Establishment of True Buddhism" (Rissho Ankoku Ron)
 1260 (Bun'ō 1): Buddhism was introduced from Japan to the Ryūkyū Kingdom.
 1260 (Bun'ō 1): The rise of pirates and increased raids from safe havens in Tsushima began to develop into a major problem.

Notes

References
 Nussbaum, Louis-Frédéric and Käthe Roth. (2005).  Japan encyclopedia. Cambridge: Harvard University Press. ;  OCLC 58053128
 Titsingh, Isaac. (1834). Nihon Odai Ichiran; ou,  Annales des empereurs du Japon.  Paris: Royal Asiatic Society, Oriental Translation Fund of Great Britain and Ireland. OCLC 5850691
 Totman, Conrad D. (1999). A History of Japan. Boston: Blackwell.	; ;  OCLC 59570371
 Varley, H. Paul. (1980). A Chronicle of Gods and Sovereigns: Jinnō Shōtōki of Kitabatake Chikafusa.'' New York: Columbia University Press. ;  OCLC 6042764

External links
 National Diet Library, "The Japanese Calendar" -- historical overview plus illustrative images from library's collection

Japanese eras
1260s in Japan